Oenomaus is a genus of butterflies in the family Lycaenidae. The species of this genus are found in the Neotropical realm.

Species
atena species subgroup
Oenomaus atena (Hewitson, 1867)
Oenomaus morroensis Faynel & Moser, 2008
cortica species subgroup
Oenomaus ambiguus Faynel, 2008
Oenomaus cortica (D'Abrera, 1995)
Oenomaus druceus Faynel & Moser, 2008
Oenomaus gaia Faynel, 2008
curiosa species subgroup
Oenomaus curiosa Faynel & Moser, 2008
cyanovenata species subgroup
Oenomaus cyanovenata (D'Abrera, 1995)
Oenomaus floreus (Druce, 1907)
Oenomaus isabellae Faynel, 2006
Oenomaus taua Faynel & Moser, 2008
geba species subgroup
Oenomaus brulei Faynel, 2008
Oenomaus geba (Hewitson, 1877)
Oenomaus griseus Faynel & Moser, 2008
Oenomaus jauffreti Faynel & Moser, 2008
Oenomaus magnus Faynel & Moser, 2008
Oenomaus poirieri Faynel, 2008
melleus species subgroup
Oenomaus melleus (Druce, 1907)
nigra species subgroup
Oenomaus nigra Faynel & Moser, 2008
unknown species subgroup
Oenomaus andi Busby & Faynel, 2012
Oenomaus atesa (Hewitson, 1867)
Oenomaus gwenish Robbins & Faynel, 2012
Oenomaus lea Faynel & Robbins, 2012
Oenomaus mancha Busby & Faynel, 2012
Oenomaus mentirosa Faynel & Robbins, 2012
Oenomaus moseri Robbins & Faynel, 2012
Oenomaus myrteana Busby, Robbins & Faynel, 2012
Oenomaus ortygnus (Cramer, 1779)

References
 , 2004, Atlas of Neotropical Lepidoptera; Checklist: 4A; Hesperioidea-Papilionoidea page 134.
 , 2006, Le genre Oenomaus Hübner, 1819, en Guyana française (Lepidoptera: Lycaenidae), Bulletin de la Société entomologique de France 111 (2): 137-156.
 , 2008: The genus Oenomaus Hübner, 1819, in French Guiana, Part II (Lepidoptera: Lycaenidae). Bulletin de la Société entomologique de France 113 (1): 15-32.
 , 2008: The neotropical genus Enomaus Hübner with description of eight new species belonging to the atena group (Lepidoptera: Lycaenidae). Lambillionea Supplément I: 1-36.

External links
"Oenomaus Hübner, [1819]" at Markku Savela's Lepidoptera and Some Other Life Forms

Eumaeini
Lycaenidae of South America
Lycaenidae genera
Taxa named by Jacob Hübner